Cellach mac Fíonachta, fl. 9th century, ancestor of Ó Ceallaigh (Kelly) of County Galway.

Cellagh was a grandson of king Ailell mac Inreachtach of Uí Maine (died 791/799). He never became king himself, but his grandchildren and their descendants, the Uí Ceallaigh, monopolised the kingship. The first Ó Ceallaigh ruler was Aodh Ua Cellaigh, who was killed at the battle of Clontarf, fighting on the side of Brian Boru. His last descendant to rule the kingdom was Feardorcha Ó Cellaigh (died c. 1611). Ó Ceallaigh, O'Kelly and Kelly is one of the most populous surnames in County Galway.

References

 Irish Kings and High Kings, Francis John Byrne, 2001 (second edition).
 The Great Book of Irish Genealogies, 731.3, 731.5, pp. 718–19, volume two, Dubhaltach MacFhirbhisigh; edited, with translation and indices by Nollaig Ó Muraíle, 2003–2004. .

People from County Galway
People from County Mayo
9th-century Irish people